Lügde  is a town in the Lippe district of North Rhine-Westphalia, Germany, with c. 9,800 inhabitants (2013).

The first written issue of Lügde appears in 784, in the annals of the Frankish Empire, when Charlemagne visited the village during the Saxon Wars.
During these wars Charlemagne celebrated his first Christmas in Saxony in Lügde, and the site then became the location of the first church to be built in Saxony. The gothic church was rebuilt in the 12th century and it is still standing today. The  church is known as the Kirche St. Kilian.

References

External links
 
  

Lippe